Roundball: 2-On-2 Challenge is a two-on-two basketball video game for the Nintendo Entertainment System that is played on a half court.

Games are played in an arena with a scoreboard and crowd.

There is also an option to play a one-on-one game. The game modes contain an exhibition game and a tournament mode. Four teams play against each other in a round-robin format in order to determine the winner. Games can be set for either four, eight, twelve or sixteen minutes. Players can choose from 24 fictional basketball athletes - named after the game developers - who each have their own individual stats. The referee is capable of calling fouls in this game.

Reception
Allgame gave Roundball: 2 on 2 Challenge a rating of 2.5 out of a possible 5 stars. N-Force gave the a 77% rating while NES Archives gave Roundball: 2 on 2 Challenge a letter grade of C+.

References

1992 video games
Basketball video games
Nintendo Entertainment System games
Nintendo Entertainment System-only games
Video games developed in the United States
Mindscape games

Player featured on the packaging Roundball 2 on 2 challenge, is former Western State Colorado University 6'4" 200lb high flying supper star Guard Stephen Castro.  Stephen Castro also former international professional basketball player for las Abejas, Puebla, Puebla Mexico, Stephen is also a former independent minor league baseball player for the East Chicago Conquistadors: East Chicago, Indiana